Yinqiao Jiedu Wan (Pinyin: yín qiáo jiě dú wán) is a brown pill used in Traditional Chinese medicine to "induce diaphoresis, remove heat and counteract toxicity". It is aromatic, and it tastes bitter, pungent and slightly sweet. It is used where there is "upper respiratory infection with fever, headache, cough, dryness of the mouth and sore throat".

Chinese classic herbal formula of Yinqiao Jiedu Wan

See also
 Chinese classic herbal formula
 Bu Zhong Yi Qi Wan

References

Traditional Chinese medicine pills